Unió Esportiva Avià is a football team based in Avià, Barcelona, Catalonia, Spain. Founded in 1963, it plays in Primera Catalana.

History
UE Avià was founded on 1963 but it not played FCF competitions until 1979–80 season. After a decade in the lower league of Catalonia football league system the club promoted four times. This season UE Avià plays in Primera Catalana, the highest regional level.

Season to season

External links 
 Official website

References 

Football clubs in Catalonia
Association football clubs established in 1963
1963 establishments in Spain